Nérac is a commune in the Lot-et-Garonne department, Southwestern France. The composer and organist Louis Raffy was born in Nérac, as was the former Arsenal and Bordeaux footballer Marouane Chamakh, as was Admiral Francois Darlan.

Nérac was visited by author Joanne Harris as a child, and was influential in the setting of her best-known novel, Chocolat.

Population

See also
Communes of the Lot-et-Garonne department

References

External links
Town council website 

Communes of Lot-et-Garonne
Subprefectures in France
Lot-et-Garonne communes articles needing translation from French Wikipedia